Swipe Tap Love (literally "Love Me, Please Leave A Message", is a Hong Kong  modern romance serial produced by TVB.

Synopsis
2009, an ordinary year for most but it was a turning point for two disheartened souls.A news report on a fire causes TV reporter, Yu Chor Gin (Priscilla Wong) to remember about her father's death from a car accident years ago. Chor Gin regrets not being able to see her father for the last time, and on the same day she meets Lok Tin Sung (Raymond Wong Ho-yin), a glass artist who has lost his sister in the fire. They accompany each other through the night silently.
Afraid to miss another opportunity again, Chor Gin borrows Tin Sung's handphone to record a "I miss you" message to her pursuer, Cheng Yat Hei (Tony Hung).Years later, Chor Gin is now a marketing manager at a chocolate factory. Chor Gin and Yat Hei have ended their 4 years relationship as they have grew more & more distant, leaving only doubts in their relationship.
Chor Gin and Tin Sung meets again as her mother babysits Tin Sung's daughter. They began communicating via text messages. Their messages content include work, family and love encouragements to each other. It seems that an app for love has already been installed in their heart...

Cast and Characters
Raymond Wong Ho-yin as Lok Tin Sung
Priscilla Wong as Yu Chor Gin
Eddie Kwan as Golden Wong Kum Gwai
Tony Hung as Cheng Yat Hei
Elaine Yiu as Emma Choi Yin
Vincent Wong as Edward Wong Chi Cheung
Kaki Leung as Natasha Sung Lau Guen 
Hebe Chan as Yeung Ka Ka
Jonathan Cheung as Roger Ho Chi On
Owen Cheung as George Ho Chi Fung
Kelly Fu as Diana Jiao Fei

Viewership ratings

References

External links
Official Website (Chinese)

TVB dramas
Hong Kong television series
2014 Hong Kong television series debuts
2014 Hong Kong television series endings
2010s Hong Kong television series